The Alexander horned sphere is a pathological object in topology discovered by .

Construction

The Alexander horned sphere is the particular embedding of a sphere in 3-dimensional Euclidean space obtained by the following construction, starting with a standard torus:
Remove a radial slice of the torus.
Connect a standard punctured torus to each side of the cut, interlinked with the torus on the other side.
Repeat steps 1–2 on the two tori just added ad infinitum.
By considering only the points of the tori that are not removed at some stage, an embedding results in the sphere with a Cantor set removed. This embedding extends to the whole sphere, since points approaching two different points of the Cantor set will be at least a fixed distance apart in the construction.

Impact on theory
The horned sphere, together with its inside, is a topological 3-ball, the Alexander horned ball, and so is simply connected; i.e., every loop can be shrunk to a point while staying inside. The exterior is not simply connected, unlike the exterior of the usual round sphere; a loop linking a torus in the above construction cannot be shrunk to a point without touching the horned sphere. This shows that the Jordan–Schönflies theorem does not hold in three dimensions, as Alexander had originally thought. Alexander also proved that the theorem does hold in three dimensions for piecewise linear/smooth embeddings. This is one of the earliest examples where the need for distinction between the categories of topological manifolds, differentiable manifolds, and piecewise linear manifolds became apparent.

Now consider Alexander's horned sphere as an embedding into the 3-sphere, considered as the one-point compactification of the 3-dimensional Euclidean space R3. The closure of the non-simply connected domain is called the solid Alexander horned sphere. Although the solid horned sphere is not a manifold, R. H. Bing showed that its double (which is the 3-manifold obtained by gluing two copies of the horned sphere together along the corresponding points of their boundaries) is in fact the 3-sphere. One can consider other gluings of the solid horned sphere to a copy of itself, arising from different homeomorphisms of the boundary sphere to itself. This has also been shown to be the 3-sphere. The solid Alexander horned sphere is an example of a crumpled cube; i.e., a closed complementary domain of the embedding of a 2-sphere into the 3-sphere.

Generalizations
One can generalize Alexander's construction to generate other horned spheres by increasing the number of horns at each stage of Alexander's construction or considering the analogous construction in higher dimensions.

Other substantially different constructions exist for constructing such "wild" spheres. Another  example, also found by Alexander, is Antoine's horned sphere, which is based on Antoine's necklace, a pathological embedding of the Cantor set into the 3-sphere.

See also 

 Cantor tree surface
 List of topologies
 Platonic solid
 Wild arc, specifically the Fox–Artin arc

References

 

 Hatcher, Allen,  Algebraic Topology, http://pi.math.cornell.edu/~hatcher/AT/ATpage.html

External links

Zbigniew Fiedorowicz. Math 655 – Introduction to Topology.  – Lecture notes
Construction of the Alexander sphere
rotating animation
PC OpenGL demo rendering and expanding the cusp

Geometric topology
Fractals